The Shiqi dialect is a dialect of Yue Chinese. It is spoken by roughly 160,000 people in Zhongshan, Guangdong's Shiqi urban district. It differs slightly from Standard Cantonese, mainly in its pronunciation and lexicon.

Shiqi has the fewest tones of any Yue dialect, perhaps a Hakka influence.

{|class=wikitable
!colspan=2|even||rising||going||colspan=2|entering
|-
|①  55 ||②  51 ||③  13 ||⑤  22 ||⑦a  5 ||⑧  2
|}

This appears to be due to mergers: the fact that the entering tone has split oddly suggests that it has split twice, as in Cantonese and Taishanese, but that tone ⑦b subsequently merged with ⑧.

References 

Yue Chinese
Zhongshan